Coma Divine – Recorded Live in Rome or just Coma Divine, is a live album by British progressive rock band Porcupine Tree, first released in October, 1997. It was expanded to a double album in 2003, adding the three tracks from the promotional single Coma Divine II (1999), and one more previously unreleased outtake. The expanded edition was also released on vinyl containing 3 LPs, plus a bonus 7 inch single with two demo versions of the song "Disappear" (later included on the compilation album The Sound of No One Listening in 2020; a newer version was included on the "Four Chords That Made a Million" single in 2000 and the compilation Recordings in 2001).
The album was finally revamped in digipack through Snapper label in 2004.

Recording
The band recorded three shows at the Frontiera in Rome (on 25, 26 and 27 March 1997) for the purpose of this release; however, only recordings from the 2nd and 3rd night were used, as the recordings from the first concert were flawed with technical problems. A vast amount of material had been performed during the shows, but the band eventually decided to release only the best performances on a single CD. While later the album was reissued as a double CD featuring an extra 25 minutes of music, there are still other unreleased performances from the show, featuring both original phases of "Voyage 34," "Dark Matter," "Burning Sky," "Stars Die," "Idiot Prayer," "The Nostalgia Factory," "Nine Cats," the first performances of "Every Home is Wired," and an instrumental called "Cryogenics" written especially to feature on the album; it was ultimately dropped as the band felt it wasn't good enough. Several of these recordings were later released on the 2020 EP Coma: Coda (Rome 1997), made available through the official Porcupine Tree Bandcamp page.

Although essentially a live record, Coma Divine features studio overdubs of the vocals, as the original takes were too poor both in terms of performance and the quality of recording.

Track listing

Original release 
All songs written by Steven Wilson unless otherwise noted.

There were various technical problems with the original CD edition due to its extreme length, and later pressings had about two minutes of audience noise removed between tracks to try to solve the problem.

Expanded edition 
All songs written by Steven Wilson unless otherwise noted.

(*) N.B. Originally released on the Coma Divine II EP in 1999.

Musicians 
 Steven Wilson – guitars, vocals
 Richard Barbieri – synthesizers
 Colin Edwin – bass guitar
 Chris Maitland – drums, percussion, harmony vocals

Reviews 

Professional reviews:
 Metal Hammer – Captured live in Rome, they reinforce both their ability and their charm through the likes of 'Moonloop' and 'The Sky Moves Sideways', lengthy but not overdone pieces, led as ever by Steve Wilson's intriguing vision. Admittedly, it'll make them few friends (live albums never do), but it's essential listening for the faithful.

References

External links 
 Porcupine Tree Official Website
 Coma Divine – Recorded Live in Rome at Snapper Music

Porcupine Tree live albums
1997 live albums